Allari Krishnayya or Allari Krishnaiah is a 1987 Telugu-language film produced by C. H. Satyanarayana and S. Bhaskar under the Vanitha Arts banner and directed by Nandamuri Ramesh. Nandamuri Balakrishna, Bhanupriya play the lead roles with music composed by Chakravarthy.

Plot
The film begins in a village that is tranquil under the governance of Narasayya (Rao Gopal Rao) and his nephew Madhavayya (Jaggayya) who inquest loyal judgments. The two families maintain a genial relationship. Gopala Krishna / Krishnayya (Nandamuri Balakrishna) a gallant is the younger brother of Madhavayya who adores his brother and sister-in-law Savitri (Jayanti). He falls for Lalitha (Bhanupriya) daughter of Narasayya, and they are engaged. Besides, two malicious Veerabhadrayya (Chalapathi Rao), and Karanam Kanakayya (Gollapudi Maruti Rao) carry out several barbarities in the village. Meanwhile, Panchayat elections step forward when a gap arises between Narasayya & Madhavayya because each of them supports different parties. Exploiting it, the blackguards create a rift that turns into a rivalry between the two and they detach. Moreover, Kanakayya conspires to knit Lalitha with Veerabhadrayya's roguish son Sundaram (Sudhakar). Krishnayya breaks their ploy and marries Lalitha who is opposed by Madhavayya, hence, they too split. Right now, it's time for a festival that is held every year under the supervision of Narasayya & Madhavayya. Here, Krishnayya takes the responsibility to conduct it and also convinces them. Thus, the knaves sacrilege the jewels of god and arraign Narasayya. At last, Krishnayya divulges the reality, acquits his uncle as guiltless, and ceases the baddies. Finally, the movie ends on a happy note with the reunion of the family.

Cast

Nandamuri Balakrishna as Gopala Krishna
Bhanupriya as Lalitha
Rao Gopal Rao as Narasayya
Jaggayya as Madhavayya
Gollapudi Maruti Rao as Karanam Kanakayya
Mikkilineni as Dharmayya
Chalapathi Rao as Veerabhadram
Sudhakar as Sundaram
Arun Kumar as Raja
Raj Varma as Seshu
Manik Irani as Rowdy 
P. J. Sarma as Collector
Malladi as Priest
Gokkini Rama Rao as Papa Rao 
Chitti Babu as Chitti 
Ramana Reddy 
Jagga Rao 
Jayanthi as Savitri
Annapurna as Purna
Kalpana Rai as Pankajam
Y. Vijaya as Chitrangi

Soundtrack

The music was composed by K. Chakravarthy with lyrics written by Veturi. The soundtrack was released by Saptaswar Audio Company.

Other
 VCDs and DVDs were released by VOLGA Videos, Hyderabad.

References

External links

Films scored by K. Chakravarthy
1980s Telugu-language films